Esko Nikkari (23 November 1938 – 17 December 2006) was a prolific Finnish actor who made more than 70 appearances on film and television. He was born in Lapua, and made his screen debut in 1974 in the movie Karvat.

Nikkari was a workhorse of the Kaurismäki brothers, with whom he first worked on Rikos ja rangaistus in 1983. His last role with Aki Kaurismäki was in Man without a Past in 2002. He starred in the 1994 film Aapo opposite actors such as Taisto Reimaluoto, Ulla Koivuranta and Kai Lehtinen. More recently, he has appeared in a number of Timo Koivusalo films such as Kaksipäisen kotkan varjossa (2005), which is the last full-length movie he appeared in. He died in Seinäjoki.

Filmography

Film 

 Syöksykierre (1981) - Kalevi
 Poste restante (1982)
 Arvottomat (1982) - Hagström
 Koomikko (1983) - Potilas
 Rikos ja Rangaistus (1983) - Inspector Pennanen
 Klaani - tarina Sammakoitten suvusta (1984) - Poliisietsivä
 Niskavuori (1984) - Nikulan isäntä
 Hei kliffaa hei (1985) - Poliisi
 Shadows in Paradise (1986) - Co-worker (työkaveri)
 Macbeth (1987) - Einari
 Jäähyväiset presidentille (1987) - Businessman at the Restaurant
 Tilinteko (1987) - Timo Varjola
 Hamlet Goes Business (1987) - Polonius
 Pohjanmaa (1988) - Paavo Hakala
 Ariel (1988) - Autokauppias
 Ihmiselon ihanuus ja kurjuus (1988) - Manager at Restaurant
 Cha Cha Cha (1989) - Policeman
 Talvisota (1989) - Private Yrjö 'Ylli' Alanen
 The Match Factory Girl (1990) - Stepfather
 Rampe & Naukkis - Kaikkien aikojen superpari (1990) - Older Cop
 Veturimiehet heiluttaa (1992) - Trainman Kauno Saario
 Vääpeli Körmy ja etelän hetelmät (1992) - Pohjalainen talonostaja
 Papukaijamies (1992) - Constable Palmunen
 Pekko aikamiespoika (1993) - poliisi Reino
 Kaikki pelissä (1994) - Rural Police Chief Louhela
 Aapo (1994) - Maanviljelysneuvos
 Pekko ja poika (1994) - Reino, poliisi
 Kivenpyörittäjän kylä (1995) - Jalmari
 Pekko ja massahurmaaja (1995) - Reino, poliisi
 Drifting Clouds (1996) - Ravintolapäällikkö
 Pekko ja muukalainen (1996) - Reino Kuovi, poliisi
 Tie naisen sydämeen (1996) - Cab Driver Lehtonen
 The Minister of State (1997) - Judge
 Vaiennut kylä (1997) - Jarva, police officer
 Pekko ja unissakävelijä (1997) - Reino Kuovi, poliisi
 Kuningasjätkä (1998) - Hannes
 Rikos & Rakkaus (1999) - Kasimir 'Kassu' Vartio
 The Swan and the Wanderer (1999) - Veikko
 Juha (1999) - Nimismies
 Lakeuden kutsu (1999) - Paavo Hakala
 Hurmaava joukkoitsemurha (2000) - Sakari Piippo
 Pieni pyhiinvaellus (2000) - Pappi
 Rentun ruusu (2001) - Väiski
 Ponterosa (2001) - Maalaisisäntä
 The Man Without a Past (2002) - Bank Robber
 Umur (2002) - Samanmoinen
 Sibelius (2003) - Red Soldier #2
 Vieraalla maalla (2003) - Beadle
 Shadow of the Eagle (2005) - Aaro's father
 Isiä ja Hirviöitä (2005, Video short) - Vaari (final film role)

Television 
 Lentsu (1990) - Autoilija Toivo Kesseli
 Hyvä veli (1995) - Matti Yli-Niemi
 Maigret en Finlande (1996) - Liikanen
 Kotikatu (1997-1998) - Pajala
 Team Ahma (1998) - Tiepalvelupäällikkö
 Kylmäverisesti sinun (2000–2002) - Patologi / Oikeuslääkäri

Awards and recognitions 
 Humanismin käsi Award 1988
 Jussi Award 1991

External links

1938 births
2006 deaths
People from Lapua
Finnish male actors
Deaths from cancer in Finland